Groenewegen or Van Groenewegen is a Dutch toponymic surname. Literally translated as "green roads", the name may refer to an origin in one of several hamlets or streets named Groeneweg in the Netherlands.  Notable people with this surname include:

Dylan Groenewegen (born 1993), Dutch road racing cyclist
Han Groenewegen (1888–1980), Dutch architect
Jacob Groenewegen (died 1609), Dutch merchant
Jane Groenewegen (born 1956), Canadian (Northwest Territories) politician
Leo Groenewegen (born 1953), Australian rules footballer
Leo Groenewegen (born 1965), Canadian football offensive lineman
Robert Groenewegen (born 1960), Australian rules footballer
Sara Groenewegen (born 1995), Canadian softball player
Van Groenewegen
Pieter Anthonisz. van Groenewegen (c.1600–1658), Dutch landscape painter
Simon van Groenewegen van der Made (1613–1652), Dutch jurist
Groeneweg
Bram Groeneweg (1905–1988), Dutch long-distance runner
Suze Groeneweg (1875–1940), Dutch politician; first woman to be elected into the Dutch parliament
Groenwegen
Nancy G. Groenwegen, American New York State cabinet secretary

References

Dutch-language surnames
Dutch toponymic surnames